Luis Ángel Carrillo Alvarado (born 27 January 1986) is a Mexican former football midfielder who last played for Atlante F.C., in the Primera División de México.

Carrillo made his professional debut on April 26, 2009, during a 1–0 loss to CF Monterrey. He played all 90 minutes.

References

External links
 

1986 births
Living people
People from Cancún
Footballers from Quintana Roo
Association football midfielders
Mexican footballers
Atlante F.C. footballers
Liga MX players